Finn Jensen (22 November 1914 – 25 August 1987) was a Danish swimmer. He competed in the men's 200 metre breaststroke at the 1936 Summer Olympics.

References

External links
 

1914 births
1987 deaths
Olympic swimmers of Denmark
Swimmers at the 1936 Summer Olympics
Sportspeople from Frederiksberg
Danish male breaststroke swimmers